Władysław Karasiak (8 January 1899 – 11 August 1976) was a Polish footballer. He played in twelve matches for the Poland national football team from 1924 to 1934.

References

External links
 

1899 births
1976 deaths
Polish footballers
Poland international footballers
Place of birth missing
Association footballers not categorized by position